Benjamin Guérard, (15 March 1797 – 10 March 1854) was a 19th-century French librarian and historian, especially known for his edition of cartularies of abbeys of the Carolingian period.

Biography 
Born in a family of Burgundian bourgeoisie, Guérard studied in Dijon from 1807 to 1814, then moved to Paris where he was first a bank employee.

In 1818, he obtained a supernumerary place at the manuscript department of the Bibliothèque royale  and decided to improve his training by following the course of the École royale des chartes established in 1821.

Became permanent employee of the Royal Library, he devoted himself to historical research, getting a mention from the Académie française for his Discours sur la vie et les ouvrages du président Jacques-Auguste de Thou and collaborated to the L'Art de vérifier les dates. But he is mostly known for his Essai sur les divisions territoriales de la Gaule sous les rois des Francs, crowned by the Académie des Inscriptions et Belles-Lettres (1830) and printed at government expense in 1832.

A founding member of the Société de l'histoire de France and member of the publishing committee of the Documents inédits relatifs à l'histoire de France, he devoted himself to publishing many ancient documents, particularly the abbey cartularies. The best known is probably the Polyptych of Irminon.

After the reorganization of the École des chartes in 1846, his courses became more important and in 1848, Benjamin Guérard was appointed director of the school.

At the end of 1852, he becomes curator of the manuscript department of the Bibliothèque impériale, but not for long since he died a year and a half later.

Selected publications 
Discours sur la vie et les ouvrages du président Jacques-Auguste de Thou
L'Art de vérifier les dates
Essai sur les divisions territoriales de la Gaule sous les rois des Francs

Editions of ancient documents
Le Polyptyque d'Irminon

References

External links 
 André Guérard on Wikisource
 Notice on CTHS

French librarians
École Nationale des Chartes alumni
French medievalists
Officiers of the Légion d'honneur
Members of the Académie des Inscriptions et Belles-Lettres
People from Montbard
1797 births
1854 deaths